Károly Reich (8 August 1922 – 7 September 1988; also written Karoly Reich) was a Hungarian artist, best known for his children's books illustrations and for his original draughtsmanship. His illustrations were popular among Hungarian children throughout his 40-year career, during which he illustrated around 500 books.

Life and education
Reich was born in Balatonszemes, the child of a farming family. He drew at home before progressing to the Hungarian Academy of Applied Art, where he specialized in the Fine Arts section from 1942 to 1944. He died in Budapest.

Work 
Reich drew his early inspirations from the beaches of Lake Balaton, where he first began to draw. His later influences included Greek mythology. With a great sense of intuition he illustrated about 500 books.

Reich's works were exhibited throughout Hungary, and internationally at shows in Essen, Lugano, Paris, Tokyo, Sofia, and Belgrade.

Drawings and book illustrations by Reich can be seen here:
 Mesevilág, csodavilág - Reich Károly meseillusztrációi
 Reich Károly grafikái a Reich galériában
 Kék királylány, zöld boszorkány

References

Hungarian children's book illustrators
Hungarian illustrators
1922 births
1988 deaths